Clemens Kuby (born 17 November 1947, in Herrsching am Ammersee) is a German documentary writer and film maker. He is a proponent of self healing techniques. He is the nephew of Nobel prize recipient Werner Heisenberg.

Biography

Mental healing 
Clemens calls his technique of self-healing mental healing.

Works

Bibliography 
(most books and movie were not translated into English)
 1993 – Das alte Ladakh. Book about movie. .
 1994 – Living Buddha. Authors: Clemens Kuby and Ulli Olvedi, .
 2003 – Unterwegs in die nächste Dimension – Meine Reise zu Heilern und Schamanen (Travels into the next dimension). .
 2005 – Heilung – das Wunder in uns. Selbstheilungsprozesse entdecken (Healing – the miracle within ourselves). .
 2007 – Selbstheilungs-Navigator. With 64 cards. .
 2010 – Mental Healing – Das Geheimnis der Selbstheilung. (The secret of self-healing) 2010; .
 2012 – Mental Healing – Gesund ohne Medizin. Anleitung zum Andersdenken (Healthy without medicine. A guide different thinking process). .

Filmography 
 1972 – Lehrlinge (1. place International Short Film Festival Oberhausen)
 1983 – Schnappschuss (with Ariane Mnouchkine and Pina Bausch)
 1984 – Mein Leben, das ich nicht mehr wollte
 1986 – Das Alte Ladakh (Deutscher Filmpreis 1987)
 1986 – Der Dalai Lama zwischen Orient und Occident 
 1987 – Neuseeland zu Pferde 
 1988 – Tibet – Widerstand des Geistes 
 1989 – Die Not der Frauen Tibets 
 1990 – Drei Jahre und drei Monate in Klausur 
 1994 – Living Buddha (Bavarian Film Awards 1994)
 1996 – Todas – am Rande des Paradieses 
 2001 – Das Leben ist eine Illusion (Life is an illusion)
 2002 – Unterwegs in die nächste Dimension (Travel to the next dimmension)

DVD 
 1987 – Das Alte Ladakh
 1989 – Not und Frieden in Tibet: Die Not der Frauen Tibets. Dalai Lama – Frieden des Geistes
 1996 – Todas – Am Rande des Paradieses
 2004 – Unterwegs in die nächste Dimension
 2006 – Selbstheilung in 6 Schritten – Joao de Deus
 2006 – Tibet – Widerstand des Geistes
 2006 – Living Buddha
 2006 – Der Dreh zu Living Buddha
 2007 – Der Mensch – ein geistiges Wesen
 2007 – Die Melodie des Universums – Global Scaling
 2007 – Seelenschreiben
 2008 – Alles ist möglich – Das Spektrum der Selbstheilung
 2009 – Heilung – das Wunder in uns

Audiobooks 
 2006 – Unterwegs in die nächste Dimension – Meine Reise zu Heilern und Schamanen. (Audiobook) (Audio CD). .
 2009 – Heilung – das Wunder in uns. Selbstheilungsprozesse entdecken (Audiobook) (Audio CD). .

Audio-CDs 
 2009 – Heilung – das Wunder in uns – original sound track. .

References

External links 
 
 Story of Clemens Kuby – personal development weblog

German documentary filmmakers
Living people
1947 births
Film people from Bavaria
People from Starnberg (district)